Thomas Maxwell Jones (10 July 1930 – 20 April 2018) is a former Australian rules footballer who played with Carlton and Footscray in the Victorian Football League (VFL).

Notes

External links 

Tom Jones's profile at Blueseum

1930 births
2018 deaths
Carlton Football Club players
Western Bulldogs players
Australian rules footballers from Victoria (Australia)